San Mateo Etlatongo  is a town and municipality in Oaxaca in south-western Mexico. The municipality covers an area of 24.40 km².  
It is part of the Nochixtlán District in the southeast of the Mixteca Region.

As of 2005, the municipality had a total population of 1085.

See also
Etlatongo (archaeological site)

References

Municipalities of Oaxaca